Châtelaine is a French-language magazine of women's lifestyles, published in Quebec by St. Joseph Communications.

History and profile
The magazine was first published in 1960 by Maclean-Hunter Publishing. It covers issues and interests of real concern to women, including food, health, style, home and current affairs. The magazine's headquarters is located in Montreal.

Châtelaine was published monthly until January 2017 when its frequency switched to bimonthly. Its English language version, Chatelaine, is published in Toronto.

Rogers Media announced on 30 September 2016 plans to sell off their French print media, including Châtelaine. On 20 March 2019, Rogers announced a deal to sell the magazine to St. Joseph Communications.

References

External links
 Châtelaine magazine (French)

1960 establishments in Quebec
Bi-monthly magazines published in Canada
Monthly magazines published in Canada
Women's magazines published in Canada
French-language magazines published in Canada
Magazines established in 1960
Magazines published in Montreal
St. Joseph Media magazines